North Johnstone is a rural locality in the Tablelands Region, Queensland, Australia. In the  North Johnstone had a population of 77 people.

Geography 
North Johnstone is on the Atherton Tableland and is north of the Johnstone River, which may be the origin of its name.

The predominant land use is grazing on native vegetation.

History 
In the  North Johnstone had a population of 77 people.

References 

Tablelands Region
Localities in Queensland